Geissomeria longiflora is a plant native to the Cerrado vegetation of Brazil. This plant is cited in Flora Brasiliensis by Carl Friedrich Philipp von Martius. In addition, this plant grows in Porto Seguro city, state of Bahia, and Viçosa city, state of Minas Gerais.

References
Geissomeria longiflora is cited in the following research articles:

 MARTINS, F. R.; MEIRA-NETO, J. A. A.; SOUZA, A. L. (2005) Cover and soil influence at understory of a Seasonal Tropical Forest, Minas Gerais State, Brazil. with have the abstract in English.
 MARTINS, F. R.; MEIRA-NETO, J. A. A. (2003) Understory structure of Sivicultura Forest, a seasonal tropical forest in Viçosa, Brazil. with have the abstract in English.

External links
 Flora Brasiliensis: Dicliptera longiflora
 Flora vascular do bioma Cerrado
The Taxonomicon: Dicliptera longiflora
 Dicliptera longiflora grows in Porto Seguro city, state of Bahia.

longiflora
Flora of Brazil
Flora of the Cerrado